Gunasti (Günaştı) is a Turkish surname meaning "exceeded the day". It is mainly observed as a surname in Turkey and USA, but is also present in Australia, Canada and Germany, along with a few others.  "Gün" means "day" and "aştı" is the past tense of the word "aşmak" (exceeding). The most well known Gunasti’s are Erbil Gunasti, Kunter Gunasti, Salih Gunasti, Suhan Gunasti and Susan Gunasti, due to the impact of their careers and how easily they can be searched online.

References

Surnames